Harvest Moon, known in Japan as , is a farm simulation role-playing video game developed by Amccus for the Super Nintendo Entertainment System. The game first was released in Japan by Pack-In-Video in 1996, in North America by Natsume in 1997, and in Europe by Nintendo in 1998. The European version shipped with language localizations for Germany and France. It is the first game in the long-running Story of Seasons video game series, previously known as the Harvest Moon series in western territories. The game has been re-released on the Satellaview, Nintendo 3DS, Wii, Wii U and Nintendo Switch.

Gameplay
The game follows a young man charged with maintaining the farm he inherits from his grandfather. The primary objective is to restore and maintain a farm that has fallen into disrepair. The player decides how to allocate time between daily tasks, such as clearing land, planting crops, selling harvests, raising livestock, attending festivals, building relationships with villagers, and foraging.

For vegetables to develop, they must receive water each day; lack of water does not kill crops, but prevents them from growing. Animals must be fed once a day to keep them producing. While the only care that chickens require is feeding, cows must be continually talked to, brushed, and milked to retain their health. A cow may become sick if not fed for a day and, if untreated, sickness can lead to death. Chickens may die if left outside, where they can be blown away in a storm or eaten by wild dogs. After dark, the only business in town that the player can access is the bar, where a number of non-player characters gather to drink and talk.

Development 
Yasuhiro Wada was producer for the game, and the last game he worked on was Magical Pop'n.

Gaining inspiration from his childhood in the countryside and the game series Derby Stallion, Wada wished to make a role-playing game without any combat. However, after some time of development, Pack-in-Video, the publishers of Harvest Moon, went bankrupt. The following merge with Victor Entertainment led to the downsizing of Wada’s development team, shrinking from ten members to only three. With a much smaller budget, the team spent the next six months finishing the game, reprogramming much of it from the ground up.

Release 
The game was released on August 9, 1996 in Japan for the Super Famicom. It was released in North America in 1997, and Europe in 1998. According to Natsume's Adam Fitch, the game sold "a decent amount for that time". Upon release in Japan, the game had 20,000 sales. Despite the recent release of the Nintendo 64 the game would sell over 100,000 units.

In the localized North American version, all references to alcohol are changed to "juice," even though anyone who drinks said "juice" clearly becomes intoxicated. While many elements of the game were Westernized for its American release, some Japanese cultural elements remained. For example, townspeople sometimes discuss the church and its religion in Shinto terms, such as referring to the existence of both a "God of the Harvest" and a "God of Business." In the "New Day" cinematic sequences, the character eats an onigiri, a traditional Japanese food item. The news anchor on TV in the game bows to the audience in a welcoming manner, which is uncommon in Western countries.

Satellaview version
BS Bokujō Monogatari (BS 牧場物語) was an episodically released ura- or gaiden-version of the original Harvest Moon consisting of 4 unique episodes on the Satellaview. Each episode had to be downloaded by players from St.GIGA (at NikoNiko Ranch on the BS-X cartridge) during a specified broadcast week and during a specified time-window. It featured "SoundLink" narration (radio drama-style streaming voice data intended to guide players through the game and give helpful hints and advice). Due to the nature of SoundLink broadcasts these games were only broadcast to players between 6:00 and 6:50PM on broadcast dates. The game was never released outside Japan and as with all other Satellaview titles it has never been re-released as a stand-alone title. Online Satellaview emulation enthusiasts refer to the game unofficially as "BS Makiba Monogatari". A single rerun of the broadcasts was conducted in the same weekly format from November 4, 1996 to November 30, 1996 at 5:00 to 5:50PM. The BS-X download location changed to Bagupotamia Temple. The episodes were known as: 
 released on September 2, 1996
 released on September 9, 1996
 released on September 16, 1996
 released on September 23, 1996

Reception

The game received mainly positive reviews and has a GameRankings standing of 73%. Crispin Boyer remarked in Electronic Gaming Monthly, "An RPG about farming? Talk about a hard sell. But this epic adventure in agriculture is as fun as it is original." He and the other three members of the EGM review team praised the game's original concept and the numerous interesting tasks the player must juggle.

For the release of Harvest Moon on the Wii's Virtual Console, IGN rated the game at 8.5, praising the game's still gorgeous 16-bit graphics and addictive gameplay. In 2018, Complex ranked the Harvest Moon 72nd on their "The Best Super Nintendo Games of All Time". IGN rated the game 46th in its "Top 100 SNES Games."  They praised the game being incredibly fun.

Legacy 

The profitable release of Harvest Moon led to development of a second game in what would become a series, Harvest Moon GB. A third installment, Harvest Moon 64, would also be developed. For nearly the next two decades, new Harvest Moon games would be released frequently, at which point new games would be released under the title Story of Seasons due to issues with rights when Marvelous chose to move their localization division from Natsume to Xseed Games.

Notes

References

1996 video games
Story of Seasons games
Natsume (company) games
Nintendo Switch Online games
Pack-In-Video games
Satellaview games
Super Nintendo Entertainment System games
Video games developed in Japan
Virtual Console games
Virtual Console games for Wii U
Video games with alternate endings